Mounir Hamoud (born 1 February 1985) is a Morocco-born Norwegian former football defender,.

In 2004 and 2005 Hamoud played in the Norwegian top division for FC Lyn Oslo. He has been capped by Norway at the U18, U19, and U21 levels.

Hamoud was called up to the Norwegian national team on 27 January 2009, as a part of caretaker coach Egil Olsen's first squad.

He signed for Strømsgodset prior to the 2012 season. With 54 league matches, he became an important part of the team who won the 2013 Tippeligaen, and secured 2nd and 4th place in 2012 and 2014, respectively. However, when his contract expired after the 2014 season, he was released from the club. However, on 15 January 2015, he signed a new three-year deal with the club. After the 2019 season Hamoud decide to retired from football.

Career statistics

Honours

Club
Strømsgodset
 Tippeligaen: 2013

References

100% Fotball - Norwegian top division statistics

1985 births
Living people
Norwegian people of Moroccan descent
Moroccan footballers
Norwegian footballers
Norway youth international footballers
Moroccan emigrants to Norway
Lyn Fotball players
FK Bodø/Glimt players
Strømsgodset Toppfotball players
Eliteserien players
Norwegian First Division players
Association football midfielders